The Lost Scripts of K.O.D. is the first EP by rapper Tech N9ne, released on March 30, 2010. It debuted on the Billboard 200 chart at number 117.

The EP consists of five tracks that were written shortly after the K.O.D. album was completed. The beats that appear on the EP had been selected by the artist for inclusion on his previous studio album K.O.D. and he already had titles in mind for them, but he ended up filling the allotted time on the CD before writing to the selected beats.

Track listing

Samples
"Last Sad Song"
"Give In to Me" by Michael Jackson

References

Tech N9ne EPs
2010 debut EPs
Albums produced by Seven (record producer)
Horrorcore albums
Strange Music EPs